Ezosciadium is a genus of flowering plants belonging to the family Apiaceae. It contains a single species, Ezosciadium capense.

Its native range is South African Republic.

References

Apioideae